This is a list of current formations of the United States Army, which is constantly changing as the Army changes its structure over time. Due to the nature of those changes, specifically the restructuring of brigades into autonomous modular brigades, debate has arisen as to whether brigades are units or formations; for the purposes of this list, brigades are currently excluded. Active status formations are shown in bold.

Armies
   First United States Army – U.S. Army Training, Readiness, and Mobilization Command formation at Rock Island Arsenal, Illinois

  Third United States Army – United States Army Central command formation headquartered at Shaw AFB

   Fifth United States Army – United States Army North command formation at Joint Base San Antonio, Texas

   Sixth United States Army – United States Army South command formation at Joint Base San Antonio, Texas

   Eighth United States Army – United States Forces Korea command formation at Camp Humphreys, South Korea

   Ninth United States Army – United States Army Africa command formation at Wiesbaden, Germany

Corps
   I Corps "America's Corps" at Fort Lewis, Washington

   III Armored Corps "Phantom Corps" at Fort Hood, Texas

   V Corps "Victory Corps" at Fort Knox, Kentucky

   XVIII Airborne Corps "Sky Dragons" at Fort Bragg, North Carolina

Divisions

Airborne Divisions
   11th Airborne Division at Joint Base Elmendorf-Richardson, Alaska

   82nd Airborne Division "All Americans" at Fort Bragg, North Carolina

   101st Airborne Division (Air Assault) "Screaming Eagles" at Fort Campbell, Kentucky

Armored Divisions
   1st Armored Division "Old Ironsides" at Fort Bliss, Texas

Cavalry Divisions
   1st Cavalry Division "First Team" at Fort Hood, Texas

Infantry Divisions
   1st Infantry Division "The Big Red One" at Fort Riley, Kansas

   '2nd Infantry Division "Indian Head Division" at Camp Humphreys, South Korea

   3rd Infantry Division "Rock of the Marne" at Fort Stewart, Georgia

   4th Infantry Division "Ivy Division/Iron Horse" at Fort Carson, Colorado

   7th Infantry Division “The Hourglass Division” at Joint Base Lewis-McChord, Washington

   25th Infantry Division "Tropic Lightning" at Schofield Barracks, Hawaii

   28th Infantry Division (ARNG) "Keystone Division" at Harrisburg, Pennsylvania

   29th Infantry Division (ARNG) "The Blue and Gray" at Fort Belvoir, Virginia

   34th Infantry Division (ARNG) "Red Bull Division" at Rosemount, Minnesota

   35th Infantry Division (ARNG) "Santa Fe Division" at Fort Leavenworth, Kansas

   36th Infantry Division (ARNG) "Arrowhead Division" at Camp Mabry, Austin, Texas

   38th Infantry Division (ARNG) "Cyclone Division" at Indianapolis, Indiana

   40th Infantry Division (ARNG) "Sunburst Division" at Los Alamitos, California

   42nd Infantry Division (ARNG) "Rainbow Division" at Troy, New York

   10th Mountain Division at Fort Drum, New York

Training Divisions
   78th Training Division (Operations) (USAR) "Lightning" at Joint Base McGuire–Dix–Lakehurst, New Jersey

   86th Training Division (Decisive Action) (USAR) "Blackhawk Division" at Fort McCoy, Wisconsin

   91st Division (Operations) (USAR) "Wild West Division" at Fort Hunter Liggett, California 

   94th Division (Force Sustainment) (USAR) at Fort Lee, Virginia

   95th Division (Institutional Training) (USAR) "Victory Division" at Fort Sill, Oklahoma

   98th Training Division (Initial Entry Training) (USAR) "Iroquois" at Fort Benning, Georgia

   100th Division (Institutional Training) (USAR) "Century Division" at Fort Knox, Kentucky

   102nd Division (Maneuver Support) (USAR) "Ozark" at Fort Leonard Wood, Missouri

   104th Division (Leader Training) (USAR) "Timberwolf Division" at Joint Base Lewis–McChord, Washington

Independent brigades and Special Forces groups

Airborne Brigades
   173rd Airborne Brigade Combat Team "Sky Soldiers" at Vicenza, Italy

Air Defense Artillery Brigades
   11th Air Defense Artillery Brigade at Fort Bliss, Texas

    31st Air Defense Artillery Brigade at Fort Sill, Oklahoma

    35th Air Defense Artillery Brigade at Osan Air Base, South Korea

    38th Air Defense Artillery Brigade at Sagami General Depot, Japan

    69th Air Defense Artillery Brigade at Fort Hood, Texas

   100th Missile Defense Brigade (ARNG) at Colorado Springs, Colorado

   108th Air Defense Artillery Brigade at Fort Bragg, North Carolina

   164th Air Defense Artillery Brigade (ARNG) at Orlando, Florida

   174th Air Defense Artillery Brigade (ARNG) at Columbus, Ohio

   678th Air Defense Artillery Brigade (ARNG) at Eastover, South Carolina

Armored Brigades
   5th Armored Brigade (USAR) "Dagger Brigade" at Fort Bliss, Texas

   30th Armored Brigade Combat Team (ARNG) "Old Hickory" at Clinton, North Carolina

   81st Stryker Brigade Combat Team (ARNG) "Cascade Rifles" at Seattle, Washington

   155th Armored Brigade Combat Team (ARNG) "Dixie Thunder" at Tupelo, Mississippi

   177th Armored Brigade (USAR) at Camp Shelby, Mississippi

   194th Armored Brigade at Fort Benning, Georgia

Aviation Brigades
   1st Aviation Brigade at Fort Rucker, Alabama

   11th Expeditionary Combat Aviation Brigade (USAR) "We Make The Difference" at Fort Carson, Colorado

   12th Combat Aviation Brigade "Wings of Victory" at Katterbach Kaserne, Germany

   16th Combat Aviation Brigade "Born In Battle" at Joint Base Lewis-McChord, Washington

   63rd Theater Aviation Brigade (ARNG) "Wings of Thunder" at Frankfort, Kentucky

   77th Combat Aviation Brigade (ARNG) at Robinson Maneuver Training Center, Arkansas

   110th Aviation Brigade "Warriors" at Fort Rucker, Alabama

   128th Aviation Brigade at Fort Rucker, Alabama

   166th Aviation Brigade (USAR) at Fort Hood, Texas

   185th Aviation Brigade (ARNG) at Tupelo, Mississippi

   244th Expeditionary Combat Aviation Brigade (USAR) at Fort Knox, Kentucky

Military Intelligence Brigades
   201st Expeditionary Military Intelligence Brigade "With Courage and Vision" at Joint Base Lewis-McChord, Washington

   504th Expeditionary Military Intelligence Brigade "Always Ready" at Fort Hood, Texas

   525th Expeditionary Military Intelligence Brigade at Fort Bragg, North Carolina

Engineer Brigades
   20th Engineer Brigade at Fort Bragg, North Carolina

   36th Engineer Brigade at Fort Hood, Texas

   130th Engineer Brigade at Schofield Barracks, Hawaii

   555th Engineer Brigade at Joint Base Lewis-McChord, Washington

Field Artillery Brigades
   17th Field Artillery Brigade at Joint Base Lewis-McChord, Washington

   18th Field Artillery Brigade at Fort Bragg

   75th Field Artillery Brigade at Fort Sill

   210th Field Artillery Brigade at Camp Casey

Special Forces Groups
   1st Special Forces Group (Airborne) at Fort Lewis, Washington

   3rd Special Forces Group (Airborne) at Fort Bragg, North Carolina

   5th Special Forces Group (Airborne) at Fort Campbell, Kentucky

   7th Special Forces Group (Airborne) at Eglin AFB, Florida

   10th Special Forces Group (Airborne) at Fort Carson, Colorado

   19th Special Forces Group (Airborne) at Draper, UT

   20th Special Forces Group (Airborne) at Birmingham, AL

Independent regiments

Cavalry Regiments
   2nd Cavalry Regiment "Second Dragoons" at Vilseck, Germany

   3rd Cavalry Regiment "Brave Rifles" at Fort Hood, Texas

Infantry Regiments
   3rd Infantry Regiment "The Old Guard" at Fort Myer, Virginia (1st and 4th Battalions only; the 2nd Battalion of the 3rd Infantry Regiment is an independent battalion serving a separate command at Fort Lewis, Washington)

Armored Regiments
   11th Armored Cavalry Regiment "Blackhorse" at Fort Irwin, California

   278th Armored Cavalry Regiment (ARNG) "I Volunteer, Sir!" at Knoxville, Tennessee.

Special Operations Regiments
   75th Ranger Regiment at Fort Benning, Georgia

   160th Special Operations Aviation Regiment (Airborne) "Night Stalkers" at Fort Campbell, Kentucky

Separate detachments
6th Military Police Detachment
947th Military Police Detachment

See also
Reorganization plan of United States Army

References

External links
Modularization Forces